A mother country is a person's homeland

Books
Mother Country: Britain, the Welfare State, and Nuclear Pollution, by Marilynne Robinson 
Mother Coutry (novel), by Libby Purves, 2002
Mother Country: Britain's Black Community on the Home Front 1939–45, by Stephen Bourne 2010

Other
Mother/Country, 2001 documentary by Tina Gharavi
Mother Country (film), 2011 American film with Cindy Pickett
"Mother Country", song by John Stewart from California Bloodlines 1969